Birbraer is a Yiddish occupational surname, the cognate of German Bierbrauer, literally "beer brewer". Notable people with the surname include:

Max Birbraer, Kazakhstan-born Israeli former professional ice hockey forward
 Yevgeny Birbraer ru, Jewish Hero of the Soviet Union

Yiddish-language surnames
Occupational surnames